Kim Tae-yong (born March 20, 1987) is a South Korean film director and screenwriter. Kim got into filmmaking before he turned 20 years old, after watching and inspired by the film The Son by directors Jean-Pierre and Luc Dardenne.

His directorial feature debut Set Me Free (2014), critically acclaimed for its stable scriptwriting and direction, is based on his own story.

Filmography 
As Children (short film, 2005) - director
Twenty's Wind (short film, 2005) - director
You Can Count on Me (short film, 2006) - director
Solongos (short film, 2007) - director
Exhausted (2009) - assistant director
Frozen Land (short film, 2010) - director, screenwriter
Social Service Agent (short film, 2011) - director, screenwriter, editor 
Night Market (short film, 2012) - director
Night Bugs (short film, 2012) - director, screenwriter
Spring Fever (short film, 2013) - director, screenwriter
One Summer Night (short film, 2014) - director, screenwriter
One Night Only (short film, 2014) - director
Romance in Seoul (episode 4: "Spring Fever") (2014) - director, screenwriter
Set Me Free (2014) - director, screenwriter
Misbehavior (2016) - director, screenwriter

Awards 
2015 35th Korean Association of Film Critics Awards: Best New Director (Set Me Free)
2015 36th Blue Dragon Film Awards: Best New Director (Set Me Free)

References

External links 
 
 
 

1987 births
Living people
South Korean film directors
South Korean screenwriters
Sejong University alumni